Nicoya is a district and head city of the Nicoya canton, in the Guanacaste province of Costa Rica, located on the Nicoya Peninsula. It is one of the country's most important tourist zones; it serves as a transport hub to Guanacaste's beaches and national parks.

Geography 
Nicoya has an area of  km² and an elevation of  metres.

Locations
 Barrios: Los Ángeles, Barro Negro, Cananga, Carmen, Chorotega, Guadalupe, Granja, San Martín, Santa Lucía, Virginia
 Poblados: Cabeceras, Caimital, Carreta, Casitas, Cerro Negro, Cerro Redondo, Cola de Gallo, Cuesta, Cuesta Buenos Aires, Curime, Chivo, Dulce Nombre, Esperanza Norte, Estrella, Gamalotal, Garcimuñóz, Guaitil, Guastomatal, Guineas, Hondores, Jobo, Juan Díaz, Lajas, Loma Caucela, Miramar (northwest), Nambí, Oriente, Los Planes, Pedernal, Picudas, Pilahonda, Pilas, Pilas Blancas, Piragua, Ponedero, Quirimán, Quirimancito, Sabana Grande, Santa Ana, Sitio Botija, Tierra Blanca, Tres Quebradas, Varillas (Zapotillo), Virginia, Zompopa

Demographics

For the 2011 census, Nicoya had a population of  inhabitants.

In early 2006, a group of researchers led by adventure writer Dan Buettner and supported by National Geographic Magazine, the National Institute on Aging, and Allianz Healthcare, designated Nicoya as a Blue Zone. This designation is granted to global regions that are characterized by the longest life expectancies. Among the ideal Nicoyan lifestyle characteristics cited by the research were the water's high calcium and magnesium content, intense daily physical activity, year-long fruit consumption, and close inter-generational relationships.

Economy

As of 1850, Nicoya harvested pearls for exportation.

Transportation

Road transportation 
The district is covered by the following road routes:
 National Route 21
 National Route 150
 National Route 157
 National Route 905
 National Route 921

Route 21 is the main road serving Nicoya, connecting the city with Liberia (76 km, north-bound). On the opposite way, Route 21 also connects Nicoya to the rest of Nicoya Peninsula, including Pueblo Viejo (exit to Route 18, and then connecting to Route 1), on the main way to San José (204 km vía Route 1).

Airports 
Nicoya has also an airport for domestic flights with no current scheduled services.

Arts and culture

The town was built in an old colonial style, in the Cordillera Volcánica de Guanacaste. Agriculture and cattle form the backbone of the city's economy, as well as the province which surrounds it.

Governance

While the town elected 61-year-old Lorenzo Rosales Vargas as mayor on December 3, 2006, he was only able to serve for about a year before quitting due to health reasons. Since May 5, 2008 Eduardo Gutiérrez Rosales has been holding the office as Nicoya's first supply mayor. They are both members of the National Liberation Party (PLN).

Sports
A.D. Guanacasteca is the city's major football team, having spent several years in the Costa Rican Primera División. They sold their licence and were moved away from Nicoya to become Brujas de Escazú in 2004. They were later reformed and play their home games in the Estadio Chorotega.

Climate
This area typically has a pronounced dry season. According to the Köppen Climate Classification system, Nicoya has a tropical savanna climate, abbreviated "Aw" on climate maps.

Education 
 Liceo de Nicoya was founded in 1956. It's an academic high school, and it provides education to the whole canton of Nicoya.

Blue Zone
Nicoya, also known as the Nicoya Peninsula has not been only recognized as one of the 5 places in the planet with surprisingly high rate of longevity but also as the highest concentration of centenarians in the world. There are many theories on why is this unique phenomenon occurring but one scientific investigation stands out, it was made on 2014 and published on 2015 by the Costa Rican National Water Laboratory by the title ¨Differences in water hardness and longevity rates in the
Peninsula of Nicoya in Guanacaste and the other districts, Costa Rica¨ Performed by Darner A. Mora-Alvarado1, Carlos F. Portuguez-Barquero, Nuria Alfaro-Herrera3, Michael Hernández-Miraulth

References

Populated places established in 1523
Blue zones
Populated places in Guanacaste Province
1523 establishments in the Spanish Empire